Perfect Shapes is the second studio album by American indie rock musician Madeline Kenney. It was released on October 5, 2018 under Carpark Records.

Production
The album was recorded in January 2018 in Durham, North Carolina, alongside producer Jenn Wasner.

Critical reception
Perfect Shapes was met with "generally favorable" reviews from critics. At Metacritic, which assigns a weighted average rating out of 100 to reviews from mainstream publications, this release received an average score of 76, based on 8 reviews. Aggregator Album of the Year gave the release a 77 out of 100 based on a critical consensus of 9 reviews.

Joe Goggins of Drowned in Sound admired Kenney's vocals saying that unlike her previous album, it stood out "front and centre, ringing out honeyed and clear as a bell with only minimal effects applied", and noted the album is "so sharply made in Kenney’s own non-conformist image, and she gets away with it. On this form, she’s destined for alt-pop greatness."

Accolades

Track listing

Personnel

Musicians
 Madeline Kenney – primary artist, guitar
 Camille Lewis – drums
 Stephen Patota – guitar
 Derek Barber – guitar

Production
 Ben Sloan – producer
 Jenn Wasner – producer

References

2018 albums
Madeline Kenney albums
Carpark Records albums